The Queensland Railways 4D10 class locomotive was a class of 2-4-2T steam locomotives operated by the Queensland Railways.

History
In September 1877, a Select Committee recommended no more locomotives be built in the colony. However some materials had already been purchased for proposed new locomotives. In 1884/85 these were put to use to build four 2-4-2T locomotives at North Ipswich Railway Workshops. Per Queensland Railway's classification system they were designated the 4D10 class in 1890, the 4 representing the number of driving wheels, the D that it was a tank locomotive, and the 10 the cylinder diameter in inches. A further four A10 Neilson class were converted to 4D10s.

Class list

References

Railway locomotives introduced in 1884
4D10
2-4-2T locomotives
3 ft 6 in gauge locomotives of Australia